Coolie No. 1 is a 2019 Indian Bhojpuri-language action romance drama film directed by Lal Babu Pandit and produced by Surendra Prasad under banner of "Prakriti Films". It stars Khesari Lal Yadav and Kajal Raghwani in lead roles. Pooja Ganguly, Sanjay Pandey, Dev Singh, Anoop Arora, Mahesh Acharya, CP Bhatt, Manoj Singh, Balram Pandey, Bina Pandey and others play supporting roles.

Cast
Khesari Lal Yadav as Raja
Kajal Raghwani as Rani
Sanjay Pandey as Raja's father
Pooja Ganguly
Dev Singh
Anoop Arora as Rani's father
CP Bhatt
 Gopal Rai
Mahesh Acharya as Raja's Maternal uncle
Manoj Singh
Balram Pandey
Bina Pandey

Production
The film is directed by Lal Babu Pandit and produced by Surendra Prasad. it is co-produced by Pooja Ghosh. The cinematography has been done by N Sarwanan, while the choreography is by Kanu Mukerjee. Manoj K Kushwaha is the writer, Atanu Ghosh is the editor, and Sanjay Bhushan Patiala is the presenter of the film. It was released in 2019.

Music
The soundtrack of this film was composed by Shyam and Azad, with lyrics written by Pyare Lal Yadav, Azad Singh and Shyam Dehati. It is produced under the banner of "Khesari Music World" label.

Release
The film was theatrically released on 6 July 2019 on the occasion of Eid.

References

2019 action drama films
2019 romantic drama films
2010s Bhojpuri-language films
Indian action drama films
Indian romantic drama films
Indian romantic action films
2010s romantic action films